Treacherous Too!: A History of the Neville Brothers, Vol. 2 (1955-1987) is the follow-up to Treacherous: A History of The Neville Brothers (1955–1985), also released by Rhino. William Ruhlmann of AllMusic writes in his review of the album that "the Neville Brothers had more than enough stray tracks from their decades of local music-making around New Orleans to justify this second, single-disc follow-up to Rhino's first Nevilles history."

Track listing

All track information and credits were taken from the CD liner notes.

References

External links
Rhino Records Official Site

1991 compilation albums
The Neville Brothers albums
Rhino Records compilation albums